Round Grove may refer to:

Round Grove, Illinois
Round Grove, Indiana
Round Grove, Missouri
Round Grove Township (disambiguation)